Nachtigall may refer to:
 Nachtigall Battalion
 Nachtigall is German for nightingale

Family name 
 Jacob M. Nachtigall (1874–1947), American architect in Nebraska
 Günter Nachtigall (born 1930), a German Olympic gymnast
 Werner Nachtigall (born 1934), a German zoologist and biologist
 Paul E. Nachtigall (born 1946) American marine sensory biologist
 [Sir] Jeffrey Helmut Nachtigall (born 1970) Canada. An Artist, male model and personality.

See also 
 Nachtigal

German words and phrases
German-language surnames